The Muintir Eolais of Conmaicne Réin, were nobles of Gaelic Ireland. For seven hundred years from the 8th century, they lived and ruled an area roughly conterminous to present-day south County Leitrim.

The Mag Raghnaill, O'Mulvey, and Mac Shanley rule became increasingly fragmented throughout the 16th century. The tuath of the Muintir Eolais collapsed with Irish defeat in the Nine Years' War, and became largely forgotten with the English occupation of Ireland.

Rise of Muintir Eolais (c. 900AD)
The dynasty of Muintir Eolais originated with Eolais mac Biobhsach, chieftain of the Conmaicne circa 900AD. Little is known about Eolais. The word 'eolas' itself means 'knowledge' in the Irish language. After his death his followers and territory are known as the Muintir Eolais (people/descendants of Eolas).

Founding families
The principal Muintir Eolais families were Mac Raghnaill's, with castles at Lough Rynn, Lough Scur, and Leitrim Village, the O'Mulvey sept of Maigh Nissi, O'Moran of AttyRory, Mac Shanley's of Dromod, and the Mac Garry sept.

O'Hart states Eolais had at least three sons- "Brocan" was ancestor of Shanley, "Anbeith" was ancestor of Mac Garry, and "Maolmuire" was both lord of Conmaicne Réin and ancestor of Mag Raghnaill ("Reynolds"), and all were related to the ancestors of Quinn and Farrell of Longford.

Normans

Invasion (1245)
Muintir Eolais was briefly occupied during the Norman invasion of Ireland. According to the Irish Annals-"". Moy-Nissi on the eastern side of the Shannon river, was the Irish name given to the barony of Leitrim. The Anglo-Normans were known as clann Costello.

Expulsion (1247)
In 1247 the Anglo-Normans were defeated by Ó Conchobair and MacRaghnaill forces. The Anglo-Norman Clann Costello were expelled from Muintir Eolais. The entries in the Annals of Lough Ce for 1245 and 1247 suggest a decisive defeat of Mac Costello ("De Angulo" or "Nangle"), and halted Norman claims to the territory of Muintir Eolais (until 1551AD, see below).

Battle of AthanChip (1270)
In 1270AD the Anglo-Normans were again defeated by the Irish forces of Connacht at the Battle of Áth an Chip. MacNamee states "". The battle occurred at Drumhierney townland in Muintir Eolais. In Irish "Ath-an-cip" means a fording point on a river, and battle-bridge marks a shallow fording point on the Shannon connecting Drumhierney (Leitrim village) with Battlebridge (county Roscommon) townlands.

Fall of Muintir Eolais (1535-1590)
Events of the 16th century combined with the Tudor conquest of Ireland brought an eventual downfall of the Muintir Eolais.

Kildare alliance (1530-35)
In the 16th century the Muintir Eolais aligned themselves to the Kildare camp, the most powerful family in Ireland. And their kinsman Charles Reynolds had a close association with the Earl. Specifically, on 5 November 1530, the Muintir Eolais signed an agreement to pay rent to Gerald Fitzgerald, 9th Earl of Kildare, in return for military protection. The arrangement benefited both parties. 

However, by 1533, Henry VIII of England wanted the Englishman, William Skeffington, as replacement Lord of Ireland. Gerald Fitzgerald was imprisoned in the Tower of London in spring 1534, provoking his son "Silken" Thomas into rebellion. The revolt was quickly crushed and the Earldom of Kildare extinguished. The Muintir Eolais lost a critical ally, leaving them politically and militarily vulnerable.

Reynolds treason (1536)

Charles Reynolds (1497-1535) of Muintir Eolais was a central figure in the rebellion. Dispatched as envoy to Scotland, Charles V of Spain, and Rome, he successfully persuaded the Pope to excommunicate Henry VIII of England Reynolds, before his sudden death in Rome. Reynolds was posthumously attainted for treason in 1536. His grave slab exists in Rome.

O'Rourke (1540)
The Annals of the Four Masters states "". The Muintir Eolais, and allies MacDermot from Moylurgh, violently objected to the land grab but failed to oust O'Rourke from Leitrim Village in MoyNissi ("barony of Leitrim"). O'Rourke used this presence in MoyNissi to lobby the English to recognise his claim of Lordship over both Breifny O'Rourke (north Leitrim) and Muintir Eolais (south Leitrim). This claim is an origin of the county of Leitrim ("O'Rourke's country"), but his presence at MoyNissi in "Mag Raghnaill country" was resented, and resisted in a 1556 legal Declaration.

Norman rent (1551)
In 1551, Thomas Nangle the baron of Navan made submissions to the English council of Ireland that Mag Raghnaill was refusing to pay him 100 kine yearly, plus knights fees, due to his ancestors. The Nangle claims were based on a Norman grant dating from 1220-21AD granting a tract comprising all the lands of MoyRein ("barony of Mohill"), and part of county Cavan, to Philip de Angulo, a Norman adventurer.  Mag Raghnaill denied the claims arguing no such duty had been paid from the beginning of time.  However both sides compromised and consented to the Council decision to awarded 6 pounds annual duty to the Baron.

Declaration (1552)
The document shows Muintir Eolais opposition to "any of the O'Rourkes". This is the earliest documented mention of "county of Leitrim". The following is the only known translation.

Twilight of a nation (1553-1590)
Sean Reynolds of Clonduff was the agreed chieftain of Muintir Eolais between 1553–80.  he built a 'Castle' at Gowly peninsula ("castle island") at Lough Scur in county Leitrim. Castle John was three stories high and surrounded by good rock land. It was residence to Sean "of the heads" Reynolds (d. 1619), Humphrey his son (d. 1661), and lastly James (d. 1729) who abandoned the castle at some point.

The Annals of Loch Cé state: "" The disturbances suggest a Muintir Eolais inspired revolt against the rule of Sean Reynolds.

English invasion (1590)
In 1590 "an immense" English army invaded south county Leitrim during the nine years war, which ended in defeat for gaelic Ireland. Thereafter, the tuath ("nation") of Muintir Eolais was extinguished, and the formation of county Leitrim marked the onset of an English occupation lasting over three hundred years.

Lough Scur Reynolds

From  the end of the Nine Years' War up until 1729 the Reynolds dynasty of Lough Scur owned large estates in south Leitrim.

Seóin "of the heads" (d. 1629)
The notoriety of "Shane" Reynolds of Lough Scur is now legendary. Tradition says he was called  ("Sean of the heads") on account of all the men beheaded (or because he was head chieftain). He maintained an army of "two hundred men", and his reputation for jailing rent defaulters, and beheading people for minor offences, was widely feared. Folklore claims Sean was killed by a soldier from Longford avenging his sister's death on Prison Island. His son Maelsechlainn was killed in 1580. His grandson Sean was captured during by the 1641 Rebellion, held captive by rebels, tortured and probably executed.

Tradition recalls this Sean Reynolds of Lough Scur invited the other Muintir Eolais chieftains to his castle for a reconciliation meeting before, in cruel betrayal, beheading them all. This alleged massacre would have occurred sometime late 16th century.

The Book of Fenagh has the following poem line: "Then will come a Gall-Gaidhel, By whom thy place (Fenagh) will be destroyed.". A marginal note, added by Tadhg O Rodaighe (fl. 1690), translates as following-

Prison Island (1600-1800s)
On 6 April 1605, Sean and his son Humphrey were appointed gaoler of county Leitrim. They constructed a 'prison' on 'Jail island' in Lough Scur. The jail cells were small with holes about six inches in diameter for air. Tradition recalls many people being hanged on the island. Prison Island was abandoned sometime before Carrick on Shannon gaol was built circa 1815 and 1824. The prison ruins are barely visible today.

Heritage (1908 to present)
The names of families descended from the Muintir Eolais are common today- Reynolds, Mulvey, McGarry, Shanley and Moran.

Two proven descendants of Eolais are recorded. Today at Clonmacnoise monastery a carved headstone is dedicated to Ódhrán Ua hEolais (d.994), scribe of Clonmacnois, the inscription reading 'Pray for Odhrán descendant of Eolas'. Another scribe named Flannchad Ua hEolais (fl. 1101AD) held the Book of Durrow.

Parts of Caisleán Seóin at Lough Scur collapsed circa 1908, but repairs were undertaken by a heritage preservation society. Today, ruins of "Mag Raghnaill" Castles exist at both Lough Scur and Lough Rynn; neither are preserved as heritage sites.

After southern Ireland regained independence in 1922, the English county administrative structure was retained. The Muintir Eolais remained largely forgotten.  In 1980 Leitrim County Council approved a design of Arms for County Leitrim that included the lion of O'Rourke (north Leitrim, and Carrigallen baronies), but excluded the Muintir Eolais (Mohill, and Leitrim baronies).

The townland of Corryolus (Irish: Coraidh Eolais, "Weir of Eolus"), lying on the junction of the Shannon and Boyle river's, directly north of Carrick on Shannon, obtained its name from "Eolus" from whom the 'Muintir Eolais' are directly descended. In the remote mountainous Cuilcagh-Anierin uplands, the oligotrophic lake named "Lough Munter Eolas" marks a borderline between west Cavan and south Leitrim.

A well established traditional fiddle group, trained by a Fr. Quinn since 1966, adopted the name "Ceolus" preserving his name, and they play music garnered from local manuscripts going back almost two hundred years.

The fictional land of "Clan Eolais" populated by "Eolaisans" and Sylphs, appears in the "Solas2" role playing game.

See also

 West Breifne
 Ódhrán Ua hEolais
 Flannchad Ua hEolais
 Eolais Mac Biobhsach
 Charles Reynolds (cleric)
 Lough Scur

References and notes

Notes

Citations

Primary sources

Secondary references

 

 
 

 
 

History of County Leitrim
Gaelic nobility of Ireland
Conmaicne Rein